Clearing the Range is a 1931 American pre-Code Western film starring Hoot Gibson and his then wife Sally Eilers. Directed by Otto Brower, it was the first film released by the Poverty Row studio Allied Pictures. Gibson remade the film in 1933 as The Dude Bandit.

Plot
As with many of Gibson's starring roles in westerns, he pretends to be a clueless "peaceful man" in front of his friends, but when trouble starts—in this case, his Banker brother has been murdered by his assistant—he resorts to clever trickery without being seen or suspected to undo the villain. By going underground, so to speak, his efforts are more effective in uncovering the murderer than a run-and-gun approach. Inevitably, the female lead, as in this film, looks down her nose at Gibson's public persona, but admires his "other" self's deeds of daring and courage, not realizing it's the same man. Eventually, he relies on fists and guns to finish the job he started with trickery. This unusually complex dual-identity plot device is a hallmark of many of Gibson's films, something that set him apart from many other Western film heroes of the era (and afterwards) who were quick to draw their six shooter to settle disputes.

Production
It was filmed in Wildwood Regional Park in Thousand Oaks, California.

Cast
 Hoot Gibson as Curt "El Capitan" Fremont
 Sally Eilers as Mary Lou Moran
 Hooper Atchley as Lafe Kildare
 Robert Homans as "Dad" Moran
 Edward Peil Sr. as Sheriff Jim
 George Mendoza as Juan Conares
 Edward Hearn as Jim Fremont
 Maston Williams as George "Slim" Allen

References

External links
 
 

1931 films
1931 Western (genre) films
1930s romance films
American Western (genre) films
American black-and-white films
American romance films
Films directed by Otto Brower
1930s English-language films
1930s American films